Richmond American University London is a private university in London, United Kingdom. Richmond was founded in 1972, by British educator Cyril Taylor.

The university awards US degrees from the American state of Delaware, where Richmond is accredited by the Middle States Commission on Higher Education. Until 2018, Richmond's UK degrees were awarded by the Open University; but from the 2018/2019 academic year, Richmond has been able to grant its own UK degrees, after receiving Taught Degree Awarding Powers from the Quality Assurance Agency for Higher Education.  This mean that all students at Richmond gain both a UK and US degree studying one programme.

History
Richmond was founded in 1972 by the social entrepreneur and politician Cyril Taylor, chairman of the American Institute For Foreign Study (AIFS), as Richmond College, The American College in London. It began teaching on the site of the former Richmond Theological College, part of the University of London, founded in 1843 as a Methodist theological college. AIFS had been previously using the college site for a number of years for their London study abroad programmes. AIFS purchased half of the college's 10-acre site for £300,000 (equivalent to £3.82 million in 2015), including the majority of its buildings and front lawns, to form a new American liberal arts college. A second campus was opened on St Albans Grove and Ansdell Street in Kensington in 1978 for third and fourth year students as well as the college's US Study Abroad Programme.

In its early years Richmond served mainly to house study abroad programmes to US students, however this changed in 1981 when Richmond obtained a licence to award US undergraduate degrees from the Washington DC Board of Education and formal accreditation from the Middle States Association of Schools and Colleges (now the Middle States Commission on Higher Education).

An expansion of the university's Kensington campus on Young Street was officially opened in March 1988 by Diana, Princess of Wales.

In 1995 AIFS spun-off the university as a non-profit educational institution. Richmond inaugurated its first postgraduate degree in 1998 with a Master of Business Administration (MBA) degree.

From 1996 to 2018 Richmond issued British degrees validated by the Open University. In May 2018, the university was granted Taught Degree Awarding Powers in the UK, enabling students to receive two degree certificates, from the US and UK.

In December 2019 the university president, Lawrence Abeln, resigned after filing a complaint with the Charity Commission against the Cyril Taylor Charitable Foundation, the main financial backers of the university. In January 2020 financial problems caused by the dispute with the foundation led the board of trustees to suspend recruitment of students for the spring term.

In March 2020 the university signed a partnership agreement with the Hong Kong-based China Education Group (CEG), giving Richmond students access to internships and exchange programs across CEG's universities and institutes in China and Australia as well as expanding Richmond's international marketing and recruitment. The partners said the deal would "secure the long-term future of the university".

By late 2021 the university had vacated most of its buildings in the Kensington area, retaining one site on Kensington High Street. It also announced in November 2021 that it will be relocating its Richmond campus to new premises in Chiswick Business Park in Summer 2022.

Organisation

Governance
The Board of Trustees is responsible for the stewardship of the university's assets, strategic decision-making and ensuring compliance with its objectives.  

The current Chair of The Board of Trustees is William Durden.  

The current president of Richmond, since December 2019, is Phil Deans.

Richmond had an average of 163 staff, including 83 academic staff, 68 management and administrative staff and 12 technical staff, during the year ending 30 June 2017.

In the financial year ending 30 June 2017, Richmond (including the UK charity the Richmond Foundation, which is controlled by the university) had a total income of £35.7 million (including a one-off donation of £10 million from Cyril Taylor) and total expenditure of £25.2 million

Academics

Constituent schools
Richmond, The American International University in London is composed of three constituent schools:
Richmond Business School
Richmond School of Communications, Arts & Social Sciences (CASS)
Richmond School of Liberal Arts

Curriculum
Richmond offers a range of majors and minors at undergraduate level in business, economics, political science, international relations, media, the arts and humanities.

Standard degrees are four-years long though may be completed earlier through transfer credits from US Advanced Placement classes, UK A and AS Levels, the International Baccalaureate and other similar qualifications.  All undergraduate programmes at Richmond follow a broad, US liberal arts approach to education, combined with the British system of specialisation.

In addition it offers a range of postgraduate degrees including Master of Business Administration (MBA), Luxury Brand Management, International Relations, Art History & Visual Culture and Advertising & Public Relations.

The university's BA psychology degree is accredited in partnership with the British Psychological Society.

Accreditation
Richmond is a "recognised body" that can award UK degrees, subject to regular inspection by the Quality Assurance Agency for Higher Education (QAA) and regulation by the Office for Students. The last QAA inspection was in May 2016, which led to the award of taught degree awarding powers (following Richmond's addressing of concerns raised in the report) for a six-year period from 17 May 2017 to 16 May 2024. Prior to this, Richmond's UK degrees were validated  by the Open University.

Richmond is accredited by the Middle States Commission on Higher Education, an accrediting body recognized by the United States Department of Education. It holds US degree awarding powers from the state of Delaware.

Campuses

The university is split between the Chiswick Park Campus and the Kensington facility, located on Kensington High Street.

Richmond's library facilities include over 60,000 books and DVDs, 39,000 e-journal titles and 36,000 newspapers and newswires.

Richmond Hill (closed)
The Richmond campus was the primary residence of undergraduate students. The university's headquarters and admissions department were also located here. The main building and surrounding subsidiary buildings occupied the site of the former Richmond Theological College, University of London, purchased by Cyril Taylor. The university relocated its undergraduate programmes to Chiswick Park in September 2022

Chiswick Park
The Chiswick Park Campus opened in September 2022 on Chiswick Business Park. It houses the university's undergraduate programmes.

Kensington
The Kensington facility on Kensington High Street is the base for the University's postgraduate students

Other facilities

In addition to its London campuses Richmond also maintains a specialist study centre in Leeds. RIASA, located on the campus of Leeds Beckett University focuses on a combination of soccer training and sports management

Student life

Student government
The RAIUL Student Government is the university's official students' union under the Education Act 1994. It organises a range of social activities on both campuses throughout the year and orientation weeks. It also lobbies senior faculty, management staff and the board of trustees on behalf of students in relation to issues of welfare, discrimination and academic appeals.

Student organizations
Richmond's Student Affairs Department offer a variety of clubs and societies for students to get involved in including Model United Nations, Gaming, Film production, journalism, Art Appreciation, Theatre, Finance and Investment, Debating, Fashion, Environmentalism, History, Politics, International Affairs, Journalism, Psychology, Community Service, Great British Bake Off and LGBTQ+.

Athletics
Richmond International Academic and Soccer Academy (RIASA) is the school's sports academy.

Sports facilities at the Richmond Hill campus included a gym and fitness studio and multi-purpose soccer, basketball, tennis and volleyball court. Student sports teams currently include male soccer teams, a men's basketball team and the Mixed Martial Arts society open to both. The men's soccer team 'The Richmond Stags' competes in the British Universities and Colleges Sport London soccer league.

Notable alumni
Bill Paxton (Hollywood actor and director)
Bobby Chinn (celebrity chef) 
Nazia Hassan (singer-songwriter)
Prince Louis of Luxembourg (son of Henri, Grand Duke of Luxembourg) 
Princess Tessy of Luxembourg (UNAIDS Ambassador)
Russ Carnahan (U.S. Congressman)
Joe Sumner (singer-songwriter and son of Sting)
Ajeenkya Patil (economist and chairman of the D Y Patil Group)
Suzan Sabancı Dinçer (chairwoman of Akbank)
Andrew Neeme (professional poker player)
Rosario, Princess of Preslav (Spanish art director)

References

External links

Universities and colleges in London
Private universities in the United Kingdom
Open University
Education in the London Borough of Hounslow
Education in the Royal Borough of Kensington and Chelsea
Educational institutions established in 1972
1972 establishments in England
Richmond, London